Constantin Agiu (November 5, 1891, Dolj County - February 19, 1961, Gura Humorului) was a Romanian Communist politician; he was also President of the Great National Assembly, the unicameral legislature of the Romanian People's Republic.

Biography
He was a carpenter. A member of the Communist Party of Romania (PCR), he was noted by Ștefan Foriș and appointed a party instructor for Oltenia (1941), and from June 1943 he was a member of the Romanian Communist Party Central Committee. During World War II, together with Foriș, Remus Koffler, Iosif Rangheț, Constantin Pîrvulescu, and Lucrețiu Pătrășcanu, he belonged to the small clandestine party faction that was active inside Romania. Even after April 4, 1944 (when Foriș was removed from the office of general secretary), he held important positions. For example, he was in charge of revenue control by the Central Financial Commission of the PCR, or conducting negotiations with the PSD for the realization of the Unique Workers' Front.

 
Agiu served as Undersecretary of State at the Ministry of Agriculture from March 6, 1945 to April 14, 1948 in the governments headed by Petru Groza, and served as the President of the Great National Assembly from 11 June to 27 December 1948. In 1956 he was sanctioned with a blame vote on the exclusion of General Ion Eremia from the party. In 1958, he joined the leadership committee of the Association of Former Inhabitants and deported anti-fascist politicians.

External links

References

Presidents of the Great National Assembly
Members of the Chamber of Deputies (Romania)
1891 births
1961 deaths
Carpenters
People from Dolj County
Romanian Communist Party politicians